Morphine-N-oxide (genomorphine) is an active opioid metabolite of morphine. Morphine itself, in trials with rats, is 11–22 times more potent than morphine-N-oxide subcutaneously and 39–89 times more potent intraperitoneally. However, pretreatment with amiphenazole or tacrine increases the potency of morphine-N-oxide in relation to morphine (intraperitoneally more so than in subcutaneous administration). A possible explanation is that morphine-N-oxide is rapidly inactivated in the liver and impairment of inactivation processes or enzymes increases functionality.

Morphine-N-oxide can also form as a decomposition product of morphine outside the body and may show up in assays of opium and poppy straw concentrate.  Codeine and the semi-synthetics such as heroin, dihydrocodeine, dihydromorphine, hydromorphone, and hydrocodone also have equivalent amine oxide derivatives.

Morphine-N-Oxide has a DEA ACSCN of 9307 and annual production quota of 655 grams in 2013.  It is a Schedule I controlled substance in the US.

See also
 Codeine-N-oxide
 Morphine-6-glucuronide
 Morphine-3-glucuronide

References

4,5-Epoxymorphinans
Opioid metabolites
Phenols
Mu-opioid receptor agonists
Amine oxides